Claude Roy (28 August 1915 – 13 December 1997) was a French poet and essayist. He was born and died in Paris.

Biography
After the fall of France during World War II, Roy was captured as a prisoner of war. He later escaped and joined the French resistance. Initially associated with the political right, by 1943 Roy drifted towards the left under the influence of Louis Aragon and adhered to the French Communist Party, openly attacking fascism and Vichy sympathizers. He left the Communist Party after the suppression of the Hungarian Revolution of 1956 and, as a contributor to Le Nouvel Observateur, became a fixture on the anti-totalitarian left. He was a signatory to the Manifesto of the 121 in favor of Algerian independence.

Awards
 1951 Fénéon Prize for Le poète mineur
 1969 Prix Valery Larbaud for his book Le verbe Aimer et autres essais 
 1985 Prix Goncourt de la Poésie

Works

Non-Fiction
 Défense de la littérature, idées, folio 
 Moi je, Gallimard, 1969 ; Folio, 1978
 Nous, Gallimard, 1972 ; Folio, 1980
 Somme toute, Gallimard, 1976 ; Folio, 1982. Prix Saint-Simon 1976
 Permis de séjour, 1977-1982, Gallimard, 1983 ; Folio, 1987
 La Fleur du temps, 1983-1987, Gallimard, 1988 ; Folio, 1992
 L'Étonnement du voyageur, 1987-1989, Gallimard, 1990, prix France Culture
 Le Rivage des jours, 1990-1991, Gallimard, 1992
 Les Rencontres des jours, 1992-1993, Gallimard, 1995 ; Folio, 1996
 Chemins croisés, 1994-1995, Gallimard, 1997

Novels
 La nuit est le manteau des pauvres, Gallimard, 1949
 À tort ou à raison, Gallimard, 1955
 Le Soleil sur la terre, Gallimard, 1956
 Le Malheur d'aimer, Gallimard, 1958, Folio, 1974
 Léone et les siens, Gallimard, 1963
 La Dérobée, Gallimard, 1968
 La Traversée du pont des arts, Gallimard, 1979, Folio, 1983
 L'Ami lointain, Gallimard, 1987, Folio, 1990

Poetry
 L'Enfance de l'Art, Alger 1942
 Clair comme le jour, 1943
 Aragon,1945
 Le bestiaire des amants, 1946
 La nuit est le manteau des pauvres, 1948
 Le Poète mineur, Gallimard, 1949
 L'Élegie des lieux communs, 1952
 La Chine dans un miroir, 1953
 Un seul poème, Gallimard, 1954
 Poésies, Poésie/Gallimard, 1953
 L'amour parle, 1953
 Jules Supervielle, 1964
 La Dérobée, 1968
 Enfantasques, poèmes et collages, Gallimard, 1974
 Nouvelles Enfantasques, poèmes et collages, Gallimard, 1978
 Sais-tu si nous sommes encore loin de la mer ? Gallimard, 1979, Poésie/Gallimard, 1983
 À la lisière du temps, Gallimard, 1984
 Le Voyage d'automne, Gallimard, 1987
 Le Noir de l'aube, Gallimard, 1990
 Le Voleur de poèmes : Chine, 250 poèmes dérobés du chinois, Mercure de France, 1991
 Les Pas du silence, suivi de Poèmes en amont, Gallimard, 1993
 Poèmes à pas de loup, 1992-1996, Gallimard, 1997
 Hommage à Jules Verne, Gallimard, 1970

References 

 France, Peter (Ed.) (1995). The New Oxford Companion to Literature in French. Oxford: Clarendon Press.  .

1915 births
1997 deaths
Writers from Paris
French communists
French Resistance members
Anti-Stalinist left
Prix France Culture winners
Prix Goncourt de la Poésie winners
French male writers
Prix Fénéon winners
Prix Valery Larbaud winners
Prix Guillaume Apollinaire winners
French military personnel of World War II
French prisoners of war in World War II
French escapees